Assurance Wireless is a telephone service subsidized by the federal Lifeline Assistance program, a government benefit program supported by the federal Universal Service Fund. The service provides to low-income eligible people a free phone, free monthly data, unlimited texting, and free monthly minutes. Assurance Wireless users do not receive a bill, are not required to sign a contract, and do not pay activation fees or recurring fees. Founded in 2009, Assurance Wireless has used the T-Mobile network for coverage since 2020.

According to Hotspot Setup, "the two largest providers of free mobile phones are Safelink Wireless and Assurance Wireless, which are available in more states than other providers." Assurance Wireless users may not bring their own device – they must use an Assurance Wireless phone. If a $40 replacement phone is purchased, the user will not have a choice of model.

Eligibility 
As of December 2020, Assurance Wireless service is available to qualifying residents of Alabama, Arizona, Arkansas, California, Colorado, Connecticut, Delaware, District of Columbia, Florida, Georgia, Idaho, Indiana, Illinois, Iowa, Kansas, Kentucky, Louisiana, Maine, Maryland, Massachusetts, Michigan, Minnesota, Mississippi, Missouri, Nevada, New Hampshire, New Jersey, New Mexico, New York, North Carolina, Ohio, Oregon, Pennsylvania, Rhode Island, South Carolina, Tennessee, Texas, Utah, Virginia, Washington, Wisconsin, and West Virginia.

Ownership 
Since April 2020, the Assurance Wireless brand has been under the T-Mobile family. This was the result of the merger of Sprint Corporation and T-Mobile US was officially completed, and after Virgin Mobile USA was officially shut down and folded into Boost Mobile. An official statement was sent to all customers July 14, 2020 stating that all customers would continue to have the same minutes, data, and service, but now on the T-Mobile network.

In 2019 before the merger, T-Mobile President Mike Sievert said in a statement to USA Today, "The digital divide is real and we want to help eliminate it. We have pledged that the new T-Mobile will maintain the existing T-Mobile and Sprint Lifeline program throughout the country indefinitely, barring fundamental changes to today's program."

References

External links

Wireless carriers
Mobile phone companies of the United States
2009 establishments in the United States